Raj Bhavan, Mumbai is the official residence of the governor of Maharashtra. It is located on the tip of Malabar Hills, Mumbai.

The estate has several heritage bungalows, trees, large lawns and a beach. It also hosts mile long stretch of thick forests, a sandy beach and several lush lawns. 

The bhavan has a precious collection of beautiful carpets, paintings, exquisitely carved doors and elegant French style chairs and sofas with intricate portraits on them. The bhavan breathes a century and a half of history.

History

The Government House, part of the historic Bombay Castle, used to be the residence of the Governor of Bombay during the British Raj until 1757. The governor's residence then moved to Great Western Building on Apollo Street, then to Parel (the site of the present Haffkine Institute) before finally settling at Malabar point in 1885.

See also
 Government Houses of the British Indian Empire

References

External links
Official site

Government buildings in Mumbai
Governors' houses in Maharashtra
1883 establishments in India